Viktor Petrovich Serebryanikov (29 March 1940 – 12 November 2014) was a Soviet association football player from Ukraine (at that time Ukrainian SSR). Serebrianikov was a member of the Dynamo's squad that for the first time won the Soviet championship title in 1961 becoming the first non-Moscow team to achieve that feat, so called "the first height". 

In 1960s, Serebrianikov became admired in the Soviet football for his "ball's arc" when the football after being hit was spinning in two planes. Later in interview he explained that the trick he picked in Brazil when the Soviet team was on tour.

After retiring from his playing career, Serebryanikov became the first head coach of Nyva Ternopil that started out from the collective farm "Path to the Communism" in the city of Pidhaitsi, Berezhany Raion in Ternopil Oblast in 1978.

He is considered as the first who received the Ukrainian Footballer of the Year award.

Career statistics

Dynamo

The statistics in USSR Cups and Europe is made under the scheme "autumn-spring" and enlisted in a year of start of tournaments

International

Honours
 Soviet Top League winner: 1961, 1966, 1967, 1968, 1971.
 Soviet Cup winner: 1964, 1966.

International career
Serebryanikov was a key player on the Soviet Olympic team during their 1964 Summer Olympics qualifications scoring 4 goals, yet the team did not qualify for the finals in Tokyo.

Serebryanikov made his debut for USSR senior squad on 11 October 1964 in a friendly against Austria (he was selected for the 1962 FIFA World Cup squad, but did not play in any games at the tournament). He played in the 1966 and 1970 World Cup tournaments.

He is statistically remembered as the first substituted player in the history of the World Cup, in 1970, the first World Cup where substitutions were allowed.  He was substituted at half-time in the opening game of the tournament, between USSR and hosts Mexico, when he was replaced by Anatoliy Puzach.

References

External links
 RussiaTeam biography 
 
 DynamoFan75. Viktor Serebrianikov (Серебряников Виктор). Football in the USSR. 2 March 2016.

1940 births
2014 deaths
Footballers from Zaporizhzhia
Soviet footballers
Ukrainian footballers
Soviet Top League players
FC Metalurh Zaporizhzhia players
FC Dynamo Kyiv players
1962 FIFA World Cup players
1966 FIFA World Cup players
1970 FIFA World Cup players
Soviet Union international footballers
Soviet football managers
Ukrainian football managers
FC Frunzenets Sumy managers
FC Nyva Ternopil managers
Association football midfielders